Aniocha South is a Local Government Area of Delta State, Nigeria. Its headquarters is in the town of Ogwashi-Uku. The communities that make up the Local Government Area are Abah Unor, Adonte, Ashama, Egbudu-Akah, Ejeme-Aniogor, Ejeme-Unor, Ewulu, Isheagu(comprising Onuiyi, Atuakpai and Obikwere), Ogwashi Uku (comprising Oloh, Isah, Azagba, Igbudu), Nsukwa, Ubulu-Okiti, Ubulu-Ukwu, Ubulu-Unor, Ukwu-Oba and Umute.

Major occupation of the citizens are farming, and fishing (especially in Ewulu, Isheagu and Ejeme Aniogor).

The predominant agricultural activities in the area include oil palm plantations in Nsukwa, Ubulu Uku and Ashama; Rubber plantation in Egbudu-Akah, Animal Husbandry in Ubulu-Unor. These communities are linked by good road networks, most of which are tarred. Metalled roads are yet to reach Adonte, Ewulu and Ukwu-Oba. The river ports in Ewulu and Isheagu link the Local Government to other Local Government Areas and States on the River Niger.

Notable personalities who hail from Aniocha South as a Local Government Area  includes Chief T. O Obichie, Chief Joel Nzemeke Ilomechine (Odoziani 1 of Ashama), Maj. Gen. Cyril C. Iweze rtd. (Former ECOMOG Commander) from Isheagu; Isaac Ekene Ilomechine (Dir. ICT, DTGH - Son of Chief J.N Ilomechine), Raph Uwechue, Ngozi Okonjo-Iweala, Austin Jay Jay Okocha, Late Chief C.N. Anumonwo (Iyase of Ogwashi Ukwu), Shirley Obichie, Peter Konyegwachie, Chief Van J Nwoko, Prof Okonjo, Mr A.O Iloka, Agbobu, Late Chief P.O.C. Ozieh, Chief G.N. Enujeko (Odoziani 1 of Ubulu-Uno), Rev. Dr. Patrick Anwuzia, and Prof. Emma Osamor (former Minister of Police Affairs), Commissioner of Police Haz Iwendi amongst others.

The oldest reigning monarch in Africa, and the whole world, is from Aniocha-south, in the person of Obi Agbogidi Alfred Oloome Okolie, the first; the Obi of Egbudu-Akah, who was crowned on 12 February 1946.

Attractions are various festivals, the famous Ngozeg hotels, Adeke Restaurants, amongst others.

The Local Government Area has a number of prestigious secondary and primary institutions, as well as the Delta State Polytechnic and Ogwashi-Uku.. 
The postal code of the area is 320.

Cities, towns and communities
 Aba Unor
 Abo-Ogwashi
 Abugba
 Adonte
 Ani Ugbo
 Aniefume
 Anifekide
 Ashaba Ubulu-uno
 Ashama
 Azagba-Ogwashi
 Azamu
 Edo-Ogwashi
 Egbudu-Akah
 Ejeme
 Ejeme-Aniogor
 Ewulu
 Egbudu
 Isheagu (including Onuiyi, Atuekpai, Nzali, Utu-Oyebala, Onu-Iyese, Utu-Eko and Okpulu-Eke)

 Isah-Ogwashi
 Nkpulu Camp
 Nsukwa
 Obi Adigwe
 Obi Anigala
 Obi Ashimili
 Obi Chukuji
 Obi Dugbo
 Obi Emenen
 Obi Nti
 Obi Okonkwo
 Obi Owodi
 Ogidi
 Ogwashi Ukwu, LGA headquarters
 Olodu-Ogwashi
 Olor
 Otulu-Ogwashi
 Ubulu-Okiti
 Ubulu Ukwu
 Ubulu-Uno
 Ukwu Oba
 Umudike
 Umute

References

Local Government Areas in Delta State